Georg Miske (9 April 1928 – 28 January 2009) was an East German weightlifter. He competed in the featherweight category at the 1956 and 1960 Summer Olympics and finished in sixth and 13th place, respectively. He won two bronze medals at the European championships in 1957 and 1958.

References

1928 births
2009 deaths
Sportspeople from Gliwice
German male weightlifters
Olympic weightlifters of the United Team of Germany
Weightlifters at the 1956 Summer Olympics
Weightlifters at the 1960 Summer Olympics
People from the Province of Upper Silesia